Danielle Bousquet (born 10 May 1945) was a member of the National Assembly of France.  She represented the 1st constituency of the Côtes-d'Armor department as a member of the Socialiste, radical, citoyen et divers gauche. She was a member of parliament from 1997 to 2012.

References

1945 births
Living people
Socialist Party (France) politicians
People from Côtes-d'Armor
Women members of the National Assembly (France)
Deputies of the 12th National Assembly of the French Fifth Republic
Deputies of the 13th National Assembly of the French Fifth Republic
21st-century French women politicians
Politicians from Brittany